Eero Epner (born on 31 October 1978) is an Estonian art historian and playwright.

In 2002, he graduated from University of Tartu in history speciality.

From 2005 to 2018, he worked as a dramatist at NO99 Theatre.

He has also done screenwriter work, for example, he is a screenwriter (with Tarmo Jüristo) for the television series Pank.

In 2021, he was awarded with Order of the White Star, IV class.

References

1978 births
Living people
Estonian art historians
Estonian dramatists and playwrights
Estonian male writers
University of Tartu alumni
Recipients of the Order of the White Star, 4th Class